Avinashilingam Institute for Home Science & Higher Education for Women is a women's Deemed University in Coimbatore, Tamil Nadu, India. It was started in 1957 by the Avinashilingam Education Trust founded by T. S. Avinashilingam Chettiar as Avinashilingam Home Science College for Women which later grow into a university.

History
Avinashilingam University was a part of University of Madras until it was separated in June 1987. It is now the largest institution in the country for imparting home science education.

Academics

Since 1989 the university has offered two majors and two ancillaries for the undergraduate degree courses. The academic year is divided into two semesters, each semester having a minimum of 100 working days.

Faculties
The institute has seven schools which comprise the respective domain departments. Each School is functioning under a Dean who is a senior professor.
The various schools are:
School of Physical Sciences and Computational Sciences
School of Biosciences
School of Arts and Social Sciences 
School of Home Sciences
School of Education
School of Management Studies
School of Engineering
School of Allied Health Science

References

External links
Official website

Women's universities and colleges in Tamil Nadu
Deemed universities in Tamil Nadu
Universities and colleges in Coimbatore
1988 establishments in Tamil Nadu
Educational institutions established in 1988